Tulbaghia leucantha, the mountain wild garlic, is a species of flowering plant in the family Amaryllidaceae, widely distributed in southern Africa. It has gained the Royal Horticultural Society's Award of Garden Merit as an ornamental.

References

Allioideae
Flora of Southern Africa
Flora of Zambia
Flora of Zimbabwe
Plants described in 1897